William L. Nuessle (May 5, 1878 – March 30, 1959) was a justice of the North Dakota Supreme Court from 1923 to December 31, 1950. He first won election to court in 1922. He subsequently won reelection in 1928, 1934, and 1940. He had previously served as a judge on the North Dakota District Courts and as the state's attorney for McLean County.

Early life and education
Nuessle was born May 5, 1878 in North Boston, New York. In 1866, he moved with his parents to the Dakota Territory, living on a farm near Emerato in Grand Forks County.

Nuessle attended public schools in the Grand Forks area for his early education. He attended the University of North Dakota, receiving his Bachelor of Arts in 1889 and his Juris Doctor in 1901.

Career
Nuessle was admitted to the bar and opened a legal office in Goodrich, North Dakota. In 1904, he moved to Washburn, North Dakota and was elected state's attorney for McLean County, holding the position for four years.

In 1912, Nuessle was elected to the District Court of North Dakota bench. On this court he served in the sixth and fourth judicial districts. He served on this court until his 1922 election to the North Dakota Supreme Court.

Nuessle was elected at the age of 44 to the Supreme Court of North Dakota. He was reelected in 1928, 1934, and 1940. He ran for judge as a Republican. After serving on the bench for 28 years he retired on December 31, 1950 at the expiration of the final term to which he had been elected. 

After his retirement, he remained in Bismarck, North Dakota. He died on March 30, 1959 at the age of 80.

Coaching record

References

External links
 

1878 births
1959 deaths
North Dakota Fighting Hawks football coaches
North Dakota Fighting Hawks football players
Justices of the North Dakota Supreme Court
North Dakota Republicans
People from Erie County, New York
People from Grand Forks County, North Dakota
People from Sheridan County, North Dakota
People from McLean County, North Dakota
District attorneys in North Dakota
People from Bismarck, North Dakota
North Dakota state court judges